The 1908–09 season was Galatasaray SK's 5th in existence and the club's 3rd consecutive season in the IFL. Galatasaray won the league for the first time.

Squad statistics

Competitions

Istanbul Football League

Classification

Matches
Kick-off listed in local time (EEST)

Istanbul Football League and Union Club Cup Match

Istanbul Football League

Istanbul Football League

Friendly Matches

References
 Tuncay, Bülent (2002). Galatasaray Tarihi. Yapı Kredi Yayınları 
 Yüce, Mehmet. 
 1908-1909 İstanbul Futbol Ligi. Türk Futbol Tarihi vol.1. page(30). (June 1992) Türkiye Futbol Federasyonu Yayınları.

External links
 Galatasaray Sports Club Official Website 
 Turkish Football Federation - Galatasaray A.Ş. 
 uefa.com - Galatasaray AŞ

Galatasaray S.K. (football) seasons
Turkish football clubs 1908–09 season
1900s in Istanbul